Milan Nový (born 23 September 1951 in Kladno, Czechoslovakia) is a retired Czech ice hockey center.  He played 16 seasons in the Czechoslovak Elite League, winning six league championships between 1974 and 1980.

Nový played for Kladno in the Czechoslovak junior league from 1963 to 1968.  He played in the elite league with Kladno from 1968 to 1972, Jihlava from 1972 to 1974, and Kladno again from 1974 to 1982 and 1987 to 1989.  He was named the top player in the league three times, and was first in scoring six times. His 90 points (59 goals and 31 assists) in 44 games in 1976–77 is the league record. Nový scored 474 goals in 633 league games, as well as 120 goals in 211 games with the national team. He holds the Czech "iron man" record, playing eight seasons without missing a game.

Nový won a silver medal on the 1976 Czechoslovak Olympic team and played in the 1980 Olympics, leading all scorers with 15 points. He appeared in seven consecutive IIHF World Championships from 1975 to 1982, and was named to the all-star team in 1976. He led all players in Moscow's Izvestia Cup with 14 goals in 1974.

Nový was named to the 1976 Canada Cup all-star team, tied for the most goals, and was the top scorer and MVP on his team.  He scored the only goal in a 1–0 Czechoslovak victory over Canada, in a game Bobby Orr said was the best he ever played in. He also played in the 1981 Canada Cup.

He played with the Washington Capitals in 1982–83.  Though he began with a goal and two assists in his first game and points in his first four games, he had difficulty adjusting to North American culture and the physical play of the North American game, finishing the season with 48 points in 73 games. He played with Zurcher SC in Switzerland from 1983 to 1985 and with EV Wien in Austria in 1985–86. Nový returned to Kladno in 1986, to help his old team get out of the second division, back into the elite league.  They succeeded, and he played in the elite league for two more years before retiring in 1989.

Nový was inducted into the IIHF Hall of Fame in 2011.

Czechoslovak Elite League awards

Golden Hockey Stick (Top player):  1977, 1981, 1982
Scoring title:  1973, 1976, 1977, 1978, 1981, 1982
Top goal scorer:  1973, 1975, 1976, 1977
On championship team: 1974 (Jihlava); 1975, 1976, 1977, 1978, 1980 (Kladno)

Career statistics

Regular season and playoffs

International

References

External links 
  
 
 
 

1951 births
Living people
Czech ice hockey centres
Czechoslovak ice hockey centres
Olympic ice hockey players of Czechoslovakia
Olympic silver medalists for Czechoslovakia
Olympic medalists in ice hockey
Ice hockey players at the 1976 Winter Olympics
Ice hockey players at the 1980 Winter Olympics
Medalists at the 1976 Winter Olympics
HC Dukla Jihlava players
Rytíři Kladno players
Washington Capitals draft picks
Washington Capitals players
Wiener EV players
ZSC Lions players
Sportspeople from Kladno
IIHF Hall of Fame inductees
Czechoslovak expatriate sportspeople in Switzerland
Czechoslovak expatriate sportspeople in Austria
Czechoslovak expatriate sportspeople in the United States
Expatriate ice hockey players in Switzerland
Expatriate ice hockey players in Austria
Expatriate ice hockey players in the United States
Czechoslovak expatriate ice hockey people